Parkent is a city in Tashkent Region, Uzbekistan. It is the capital of Parkent District. Its population is 60,200 (2016). It is home to the Solar furnace of Uzbekistan which is the largest solar furnace in the world by mirror surface area.

References

Populated places in Tashkent Region
Cities in Uzbekistan